Pauline Latto is a paralympic athlete from Great Britain competing mainly in category F37 javelin events.

Pauline competed in the javelin in both the 2000 and 2004 Summer Paralympics winning a silver medal in the earlier.

References

Paralympic athletes of Great Britain
Athletes (track and field) at the 2000 Summer Paralympics
Athletes (track and field) at the 2004 Summer Paralympics
Paralympic silver medalists for Great Britain
Living people
Medalists at the 2000 Summer Paralympics
Year of birth missing (living people)
Paralympic medalists in athletics (track and field)
British female javelin throwers